Yang Dezhong (1 December 1923 – 12 November 2020) was a general in the People's Liberation Army of China who served as party secretary of Tsinghua University from 1970 to 1972 and director of the Central Guard Bureau from 1978 to 1994.

He was a member of the 12th, 13th and 14th Central Committee of the Chinese Communist Party.

Biography
Yang was born into an intellectual family in Xi'an, Shaanxi, on 1 December 1923, while his ancestral home in Weinan. He attended Xi'an Provincial No. 1 High School and graduated from the Counter-Japanese Military and Political University. He became a member of the Chinese National Liberation Vanguard in 1936. He enlisted in the Eighth Route Army in 1938, and joined the Chinese Communist Party (CCP) at the same year.

He was political commissar of the Central Guard Regiment in June 1953, and held that office until February 1974. He also served as deputy director of the Central Guard Bureau since 1965. As a result of his distinguished performance, he was made party secretary of Tsinghua University. He was appointed director of the Central Guard Bureau in December 1978, in addition to serving as deputy director of the General Office of the Chinese Communist Party in September 1980 and director of the Security Bureau of the People's Liberation Army General Staff Department in January 1983.

He was promoted to the rank of lieutenant general (zhongjiang) in September 1988 and general (shangjiang) in 1994. 

On 12 November 2020, he died in Beijing, at the age of 96.

References

1923 births
2020 deaths
People from Xi'an
Counter-Japanese Military and Political University alumni
People's Liberation Army generals from Shaanxi
People's Republic of China politicians from Shaanxi
Chinese Communist Party politicians from Shaanxi
Members of the 12th Central Committee of the Chinese Communist Party
Members of the 13th Central Committee of the Chinese Communist Party
Members of the 14th Central Committee of the Chinese Communist Party